Pernastela charon, also known as the lowland forest pinhead snail, is a species of land snail that is endemic to Australia's Lord Howe Island in the Tasman Sea.

Description
The trochoidal shell of the mature snail is 2.1–2.5 mm in height, with a diameter of 3.2–3.5 mm, and a raised spire. It is cream to pale golden-brown in colour. The whorls are rounded and flattened below an angular periphery, with moderately spaced radial ribs. It has a roundedly lunate aperture, flattened on the upper side by a reflected lip, and a moderately wide umbilicus.

Distribution and habitat
The snail is commonest in the settlement area of the island's lowlands, inhabiting plant litter in mixed forest.

References

 
 

 
charon
Gastropods of Lord Howe Island
Taxa named by Tom Iredale
Gastropods described in 1944